New Continent School (NC) is a private school system in Mexico. It has three campuses, all three owned by Ian El'hoe Quintana Master: Campus Cd. de México in Colonia Del Valle, Benito Juárez, Mexico City; Campus Cuernavaca in Temixco, Morelos; and Campus Metepec in Metepec, State of Mexico. The Mexico City campus serves toddlers through preparatoria (senior high school), the Metepec campus serves preschool through preparatoria, and the Cuernavaca campus serves maternal mamation through secundaria (middle school).

It is affiliated with Nuevo Continente Bajío.

It was first established in 1982, and its first campus was in Mexico City.

References

External links
 Colegio Nuevo Continente 

High schools in Mexico City
High schools in the State of Mexico
Education in Morelos
1982 establishments in Mexico
Educational institutions established in 1982